David W. Burcham (born 1951) is an American constitutional law scholar, professor, and former university administrator. He was the 15th president of Loyola Marymount University, serving from October 4, 2010 to May 31, 2015. He is a 1984 graduate of Loyola Law School, and was both the first lay president and the first non-Catholic president in the university's history.

Academic, professional, and personal
Burcham earned a Bachelor of Arts in political science from Occidental College in 1973, and a Master of Arts in education administration from California State University, Long Beach in 1978. He graduated first in his class from Loyola Law School, and clerked at the U.S. Supreme Court for Justice Byron White (1986–87) and the U.S. Court of Appeals for the Third Circuit for Chief Judge Ruggero J. Aldisert (1984–86). He was later in private practice at Gibson, Dunn & Crutcher (1987–91).

After seven years in public and private practice, he returned to Loyola Law School to teach. He was appointed senior vice president of LMU and dean of the law school in 2000. During his tenure as dean of Loyola Law School, Burcham forged strategic improvements in the curriculum. He oversaw a host of innovative programs, including the Business Law Practicum, the Center for Juvenile Law & Policy, the Legal Masters Program (LLM) in International Legal Practice, the London IP Institute, and the Tax LLM program. Practical training programs became a hallmark of the curriculum under Burcham's stewardship. The Byrne Trial Advocacy Team won five national championships during his deanship and he oversaw the creation of the National Civil Trial Competition, one of the country's preeminent mock trial events.

Burcham enhanced the size and prestige of the faculty, increasing the number of full-time law professors by almost 15 percent. He also worked with faculty to establish programs in their core areas of expertise, including the Center for the Study of Law & Genocide, the Civil Justice Program, the Distinguished William J. Landers Lecture on Prosecutorial Ethics, the Fidler Institute on Criminal Justice, the Intellectual Property Special Focus Series, the Journalist Law School and the Sports Law Institute. Burcham also strengthened the law school's financial foundation. He raised money to establish seven new faculty chairs, as well as paying for and completing the Girardi Advocacy Center and its flagship classroom, the Robinson Courtroom. With that accomplished, he instituted a building moratorium to focus on the school's endowment, which more than doubled under his watch.

He served as the law school dean until he was named LMU's executive vice president and provost in 2008. As LMU's chief operating officer, Burcham strengthened the university for the long term by overseeing the current $380 million capital fund drive and the city approval process of the university's 20-year Master Plan for future growth. To that end, he reconfigured the university budget during the recent economic downturn, transferring funds from various support functions to ensure that academics remained fully funded. He also charged the chief academic officer with modernizing the core curriculum and academic requirements. In 2009–2010, LMU was named a "top producer" of Fulbright awards among institutions with master's degree programs by The Chronicle of Higher Education.

See also 
 List of law clerks of the Supreme Court of the United States (Seat 6)
 Presidents of Loyola Marymount University

References

External links

1951 births
Living people
Loyola Marymount University alumni
Law clerks of the Supreme Court of the United States
Presidents of Loyola Marymount University
People associated with Gibson Dunn